Amar a morir is a Chilean telenovela produced and broadcast by TVN from March 4 to September 30, 2019. It stars Felipe Braun, Antonia Zegers, Ricardo Fernández and María José Illanes.

Cast 
 Felipe Braun as Caco Vidal
 Antonia Zegers as Pachi Palacios
Ricardo Fernández as Rafael Figueroa
 Francisco Reyes as Nicolás Vidal
 Carolina Arregui as Victoria Quezada
 Bastián Bodenhöfer as Nano Palacios
Ximena Rivas as Gladys Letelier
María José Illanes as Toya Palacios
Emilia Noguera as Susana Vasconcellos
 César Sepúlveda asBernardo Canessa
Óscar Hernández as Emilio Cintolesi
Paulina Urrutia as Rita Jaramillo
Juan Pablo Miranda as Marcos Oblitas
 Daniela Estay as Maite Salvatierra
 Raimundo Alcalde as Álvaro Vidal
 Vivianne Dietz as Rocío Figueroa
 Tomás Robertson as Simón Vidal
 Javiera Gaete as Jacinta Palacios
 Diego Chávez as Matías Figueroa
 Aída Caballero as Milagros Vidal
 Ana María Navarro as Luchita Castro

References

External links 
  
 

2019 Chilean television series debuts
2019 Chilean television series endings
2019 telenovelas
Chilean telenovelas
Televisión Nacional de Chile telenovelas
Spanish-language telenovelas
Television shows set in Santiago